Justa Peak is a peak,  high, lying southwest of Busen Point on the north coast of South Georgia. The name appears to be first used on a 1929 British Admiralty chart.

References

Mountains and hills of South Georgia